The Fairview Art Collection is a private art collection in Subiaco, Western Australia. The collection's stated goal is to raise the profile of Australian women painters by preserving and exhibiting their work.

Collection

The collection comprises ceramics, sculpture and fine art from both established and lesser-known Australian artists, with an emphasis on the work of 20th-century Australian women painters. The collection is curated by former ABC broadcaster Thomas Murrell and can be viewed by appointment. It was exhibited in regional galleries during the COVID-19 pandemic.

Artists with work in the Fairview Art Collection include:
 
 Carole Ayres 
 Joan Bayliss 
 Genevieve Berry 
 Jessamine Buxton 
 Christine Davis 
 Phyllis Faldon 
 Margaret Frew 
 Mavis Lightly 
 Lene Makwana 
 May O’Neill 
 Joy Tomcala 
 Marie Tuck 
 Mary M. Wigg 
 Aurelie Yeo 
 Deborah Zibah

Fairview Historic Home

The Fairview Art Collection is housed in the Fairview Historic Home, a Queen Anne federation villa built in 1915. Part of the larger Chesters estate heritage precinct, the building is classified by both the National Trust and Subiaco Local Heritage Survey as a place of historical significance. It is also noted for its well-preserved leadlight windows and rose garden.

References

External links

Australian art
Private art collections
Heritage places in Perth, Western Australia
Federation style architecture